Kindazi (dkinda2-zi) was a minor Sumerian god. He was a "divine barber" and an acolyte of god Ningirsu.

He is known from inscriptions, such as a macehead dedicated by queen Ninkagina for the life of King Nam-mahani of Lagash:

He also appears in various other inscriptions, such as the Gudea cylinders.

References

Mesopotamian gods